Gargoyles is an animated television series that aired from October 24, 1994 to February 15, 1997. A total of 78 half-hour episodes of Gargoyles were produced. The first two seasons aired in The Disney Afternoon programming block, the third and final season aired on the Disney's One Saturday Morning block on ABC as Gargoyles: The Goliath Chronicles.

Although the first two seasons were considered successful, Gargoyles did not live up to Disney's expectations as a commercial rival to Batman: The Animated Series. This result, combined with poor ratings for the third season, led Disney to cancel the series. The Goliath Chronicles aired its final episode on February 15, 1997.

Series overview
{|class=wikitable style="text-align:center"
! colspan=2 rowspan=2| Season
! rowspan=2| Episodes
! colspan=2| Originally aired
|-
! First aired
! Last aired
|-
| style="width:3px; background:#689BBD"|
! 1
| 13
| 
| 
|-
| style="background:#B1150C"|
! 2
| 52
| 
| 
|-
| style="background:#FFD700"|
! 3
| 13
| 
| 
|}

Episodes

Season 1 (1994–1995)
The first season premiered with the five-part pilot episode "Awakening," and consisted of a total of thirteen episodes.

The survivors of a clan of 10th-century Scottish gargoyles are brought back to life in modern-day New York City, having been frozen in stone sleep for a thousand years. With the help of police detective Elisa Maza they keep their existence a secret, while learning about the changes that have taken place in the world—and begin to figure out where they belong in it.

Season 2 (1995–1996) 
The second season premiered on September 4, 1995, and consisted of 52 episodes. The Gargoyles have now sworn to protect their adopted city of New York, while still keeping themselves secret from the public.

Beginning with the three-part episode "Avalon" and continuing for much of the rest of the season, episodes focus on a small group of characters—Goliath, his daughter Angela, Elisa, and Bronx—who are sent on a series of quests by the magical island of Avalon. The season concludes with a series of interrelated stories that begins with the two-part episode "The Gathering".

Season 3: The Goliath Chronicles (1996–1997)

Disney cancelled the original show's syndicated run in 1996, but ABC immediately picked it up, renaming it Gargoyles: The Goliath Chronicles. The revamped show, with a largely new staff of writers and animators, ran on ABC's Saturday morning schedule for a single season consisting of 13 episodes.

Following the events of "Hunter's Moon", the public is now fully aware of the existence of the Gargoyles; season 3 deals with the public's sometimes prejudicial misunderstanding of the Gargoyles' natures and intentions. The show was animated by Nelvana, an animation studio in Canada.

DVD releases

References

External links 
 
 
 

Lists of American children's animated television series episodes
Lists of Canadian children's animated television series episodes
Lists of Disney television series episodes
Episodes